Emigrate is an industrial metal band based in New York City led by Richard Kruspe, the lead guitarist of Rammstein.

History 

Kruspe started the band in 2005, writing songs with ex-wife Caron Bernstein, when Rammstein decided to take time off from touring and recording. Kruspe has previously stated that the idea for Emigrate came to him around Rammstein's Mutter era.

On September 5, 2006, members of the Rammstein.de newsletter were sent an invitation to the Emigrate newsletter and given the chance to download the song "Wake Up", a sneak peek of the upcoming album. Three song samples were also posted on Emigrate's website: "My World", "Babe", and "Temptation". Fans voted "Babe" as being their favorite, and newsletter recipients were allowed to download "Babe" in its entirety starting November 29, 2006. Babe is the only one of these songs where the subject matter, a parent's unconditional love for their child, is not Bernstein's point of view, as she didn't have any children at the time. Kruspe then explained exactly how he felt and she turned his feelings into lyrics. As opposed to "My World" which is entirely about her feelings of her life as it related to her world. On May 21, 2007, Emigrate's official website opened and "My World" was made available for download in its entirety to newsletter subscribers.

The video for "My World" has been released and can be viewed on the official website. The video was also included on the limited edition release of the album Emigrate. In addition to the video, "My World" is featured on the soundtracks to the third Resident Evil movie, Resident Evil: Extinction and True Confessions of a Hollywood Starlet. The soundtracks to the previous two movies contained "Halleluja" and "Mein Teil" from Rammstein, respectively. On July 27, 2007, Kruspe made an appearance on Bruce Dickinson's rock show on BBC. A video for "New York City" has been released. Kruspe then left the Emigrate project aside due to Rammstein reuniting in the fall of 2007 to work on their new album Liebe ist für alle da which was released in October 2009, and also to take part in the subsequent Rammstein tour.

Joe Letz, who had appeared in the video for "My World", updated the Emigrate Facebook page on June 24, 2011, stating that Kruspe had been working on a new record.

On December 5, 2012, an announcement posted on the Emigrate Facebook page announced that demos were being recorded and reviewed, and studio time was being set up in January 2013 to begin official recording of an untitled second album.

In January 2013, Kruspe stated via the Emigrate Facebook page that drums were beginning to be mixed for the new record.

In January 2014, Kruspe, on the Emigrate Facebook page, posted that twenty tracks had been recorded for Emigrate and that mixing would be performed in Los Angeles, California, alongside Ben Grosse, with a projected release in the summer of 2014. On March 7, 2014, Kruspe announced the second album was complete and he is departing back to Berlin.

On July 22, 2014, a post was made to Emigrate's official Facebook page with a teaser trailer to Emigrate's new album, titled Silent So Long and an official release date of October 17, 2014.

On December 9, 2014, Emigrate's second album titled Silent So Long was released.

On July 26, 2018, a post on the official Facebook page announced the upcoming filming of a new music video with guests Benjamin Kowalewicz and Ian D'Sa of Billy Talent, inviting applications to participate in the recording.

Emigrate's third album, A Million Degrees, was released on November 30, 2018.

Members 
Current members
 Richard Kruspe – lead guitar, lead vocals, keyboards, electro sequencer (2005–present)
 Arnaud Giroux – bass, backing vocals (2005–present)
 Mikko Sirén – drums (2013–present)
 Sky van Hoff – bass, additional guitars, synths & production (2018–present)

Regular guest members
 Joe Letz – live drums (2007–present)
 Andrea Marino – live keyboards (2021–present)
 Alice Lane – live bass (2021–present)

Former members
 Olsen Involtini – rhythm guitar, backing vocals (2005–2018)
 Henka Johansson – drums (2005–2008, 2021)

Discography

Albums

Singles

Music videos 
 "My World"
 Features Richard Kruspe on vocals and lead guitar, Arnaud Giroux on bass, Joe Letz on drums, and Margaux Bossieux on rhythm guitar.
 "New York City"
 Directed by the same director of "My World".
 "Eat You Alive"
 Features Richard Kruspe on vocals and lead guitar, Arnaud Giroux on rhythm guitar, Joe Letz on drums, Margaux Bossieux on bass, and Frank Dellé of Seeed on guest vocals.
 "1234"
 Features Richard Kruspe on vocals and lead guitar, Joe Letz on drums, Margaux Bossieux on bass, and Benjamin Kowalewicz and Ian D'Sa of Billy Talent on guest vocals and rhythm guitar, respectively.
 "War"

References

External links 
 
 
 Interview with Richard Kruspe, 2008
 

2005 establishments in New York (state)
American alternative metal musical groups
American industrial metal musical groups
Heavy metal musical groups from New York (state)
Musical groups established in 2005
Musical groups from New York City
Musical quartets